The 2019 Kyrgyzstan Football Super Cup (Kyrgyz: Кыргызстандын футбол Суперкубогу) was the 9th Kyrgyzstan Super Cup match, a football match which will contest between the 2019 Top League and 2019 Kyrgyzstan Cup champion, Dordoi, and 2019 Top League and 2019 Kyrgyzstan Cup runners-up Alay.

Match details

References

External links
 2019 Kyrgyzstan Super Cup at AFC

Super Cup
Kyrgyzstan Super Cup